Stanley Urban District could refer to:

Stanley Urban District, County Durham
Stanley Urban District, Yorkshire